The Roman Catholic Diocese of Tarma is a diocese located in the city of Tarma in the Ecclesiastical province of Huancayo in Peru.

History
15 May 1958: Established as Territorial Prelature of Tarma from the Diocese of Huancayo and Diocese of Huánuco
21 December 1985: Promoted as Diocese of Tarma

Ordinaries, in reverse chronological order

 Bishops of Tarma (Roman rite), below
 Bishop Timoteo Solórzano Rojas, M.S.C. (2022.06.18 – ...)
 Bishop Luis Alberto Barrera Pacheco, M.C.C.I. (2016.10.25 – 2021.04.17), appointed Bishop of Callao
 Bishop Richard Daniel Alarcón Urrutia (2001.06.13 – 2014.10.28), appointed Archbishop of Cuzco
 Bishop Luis Abilio Sebastiani Aguirre, S.M. (1992.11.21 – 2001.06.13), appointed Archbishop of Ayacucho o Huamanga
 Bishop Lorenzo Unfried Gimpel, M.C.C.I. (1985.12.21 – 1988.11.29); see below
 Prelates of Tarma (Roman rite), below
 Bishop Lorenzo Unfried Gimpel, M.C.C.I. (1980.09.19 – 1985.12.21); see above
 Bishop Antonio Kühner y Kühner, M.C.C.I. (1958.05.15 – 1980.07.24), appointed Bishop of Huánuco

See also
Roman Catholicism in Peru

Sources
 GCatholic.org
 Catholic Hierarchy

Roman Catholic dioceses in Peru
Roman Catholic Ecclesiastical Province of Huancayo
Christian organizations established in 1958
Roman Catholic dioceses and prelatures established in the 20th century
1958 establishments in Peru